Ahle is a surname. Notable people with the surname include:

 Jesper Ahle (born 1981), Danish handball player
 Johann Rudolph Ahle (1625–1673), German composer
 Johann Georg Ahle (1651–1706), German composer

See also
 Ahle (Schwülme), a river of Lower Saxony, Germany, tributary of the Schwülme
 Acute hemorrhagic leukoencephalitis, a neurological disorder
 

German-language surnames